Take Care of Your Scarf, Tatiana, also translated as Take Care of Your Scarf, Tatjana, is a 1994 Finnish/German film directed, produced and co-written by Aki Kaurismäki. The film tells the story of two shy and unaccomplished middle-aged men who run away from their mothers' homes and drive aimlessly on the back roads of Finland.

Plot
Valto (Mato Valtonen) lives with his mother, who runs a clothing business. Valto is seen sewing clothes for his mother at the beginning of the film. When he discovers the coffee has run out, and his mother refuses to make him a new one straight away, he locks her in a cupboard, steals her money and goes out. Valto finds Reino (Matti Pellonpää), who has been fixing Valto's car. They then go on a road trip with no apparent destination. With music coming out of a in-car vinyl player of Valto's car and Reino's story about how he got into some legal trouble after he punched someone, the two seemingly enjoy the road trip. This is a typical Kaurismäki's ordinary-scene-made-interesting moment.

When they make a stop at a bar, they meet Tatiana (Kati Outinen) from Estonia and Klavdia (Kirsi Tykkyläinen) from Russia. Tatiana and Klavdia ask Valto and Reino to drive them to a harbour. Since Valto and Reino's road trip does not have a clear destination at the first place, Valto and Reino agree to take Tatiana and Klavdia.

Throughout the journey, Valto has been drinking coffee and Reino drinking vodka. Although Reino is reserved in his nature, he sits down next to Tatiana during one of the stops of the journey. Tatiana relaxes her head on Reino's shoulder. The film suggests the two have fallen in love at this point.

At the end of the film, Reino and Tatiana remain in love with each other and live together in Estonia whereas Valto returns home, releases his mother out of the cupboard and resumes sewing clothes.

Cast

External links
 
 
 
 
 
 
 

Films directed by Aki Kaurismäki
1990s Finnish-language films
1994 films
Finnish black-and-white films